DOV-102,677 is a psychoactive drug being developed by Merck and is currently in clinical trials. It is a triple reuptake inhibitor (TRI), or serotonin-norepinephrine-dopamine reuptake inhibitor (SNDRI). It is the (−)-enantiomer of DOV-216,303, and its (+)-enantiomer is DOV-21,947 (amitifadine).

Instead of being developed for depression, DOV-102,677 is being developed for the treatment of alcoholism.

IC50 values for the SERT, NET and DAT are 129 nM, 103 nM, and 133 nM.

DOV-102,677 (20 mg/kg IP) increased extracellular levels of dopamine and serotonin in the prefrontal cortex to 320 and 280% above baseline 100 min after administration. Dopamine levels were stably increased for the duration (240 min) of the study, but serotonin levels declined to baseline by 200 min after administration. Norepinephrine levels increased linearly to a maximum of 348% at 240 min post-dosing.

References 

Chloroarenes
Cyclopropanes
Serotonin–norepinephrine–dopamine reuptake inhibitors